Mindaugas Kvietkauskas (born 27 May 1976) is a Lithuanian politician. He served as Minister of Culture in the Skvernelis Cabinet led by Prime Minister Saulius Skvernelis from 11 January 2019 to 11 December 2020.

References 

Living people
1976 births
Place of birth missing (living people)
21st-century Lithuanian politicians
Ministers of Culture of Lithuania
20th-century Lithuanian people